Otto Maier (23 December 1887 – 29 May 1957) was a German rowing coxswain who competed in the 1912 Summer Olympics.

He was the coxswain of the German boat which won the gold medal in the coxed four event. For this competition there are two coxswains reported. Maier and Karl Leister are known to have competed, but it is not known who participated in the final. However the IOC medal database credits the gold medal to Karl Leister.

References

External links
profile

1887 births
1957 deaths
Rowers at the 1912 Summer Olympics
Olympic rowers of Germany
German male rowers
Coxswains (rowing)